Landry Fernand Charles Marrier de Lagatinerie (16 October 1912 – 18 September 1999), known professionally as Gérard Landry, was an Argentinian actor. He began acting in 1932 with his first movie Mirages de Paris, acted for over fifty years and has been in over ninety films. Landry also starred in Les Trottoirs de Bangkok (The Sidewalks of Bangkok), a film from French director Jean Rollin.

Life 
Landry married twice. His first wife was actress Jacqueline Porel (1918-2012), they had a son, actor Marc Porel, but the marriage ended in divorce. His second wife was Janine Darcey (1917–1993). Gérard Landry died 18 September 1999 in Nice, France, aged 86.

Filmography

References

External links
 

1912 births
1999 deaths
Argentine male actors
People from Buenos Aires
20th-century Argentine male actors
Argentine emigrants to France